"Hip Hop Drunkies" is a song written and performed by American hip hop group Tha Alkaholiks featuring Wu-Tang Clan member Ol' Dirty Bastard. It was released in 1997 through Loud Records as the lead single from Tha Liks' third studio album Likwidation. Recording sessions took place at Soundcastle in Los Angeles and at Marley's House Of Hits in New York. Production was handled by E-Swift with co-production from Marley Marl. The single peaked at number 66 on the Billboard Hot 100, at number 37 on the Hot R&B/Hip-Hop Songs, and at number 6 on the Hot Rap Songs, making it the group's most successful single.

In 1999, the song appeared on Wu-Tang compilation album Wu-Chronicles.

Track listing

Personnel 

 James Robinson – main artist, songwriter
 Rico Smith – main artist, songwriter
 Eric Brooks – main artist, songwriter, producer, mixing
 Russell Jones – featured artist, songwriter
 Marlon Williams – co-producer, songwriter
 Jean-Marie Horvat – engineering, mixing
 Mark Chalecki – mastering
 Ola Kudu – art direction
 Ron Croudy – design

Charts

References

External links 
 

1997 songs
1997 singles
Loud Records singles
Ol' Dirty Bastard songs
Songs written by Ol' Dirty Bastard
Songs written by Marley Marl